Anomalopsychidae is a family of caddisflies belonging to the order Trichoptera.

Genera:
 Anomalopsyche Flint, 1967  
 Contulma Flint, 1969

References

Trichoptera
Trichoptera families